Klęczkowo  is a village in the administrative district of Gmina Stolno, within Chełmno County, Kuyavian-Pomeranian Voivodeship, in north-central Poland. It is located in Chełmno Land within the historic region of Pomerania.

Transport
The Polish A1 motorway and National road 55 pass through the village.

Notable people
  (1702–1758), Bishop of Chełmno
  (1787–1871), Polish printer and publisher

References

Villages in Chełmno County